David Olson may also refer to:

David E. Olson, American chemist and neuroscientist
David R. Olson (born 1935), Canadian cognitive developmental psychologist

See also
David Olsen (disambiguation)